Riversleigh fauna is the collective term for any species of animal identified in fossil sites located in the Riversleigh World Heritage Area.

Faunal zones 
The presence of the Riversleigh in the Oligo-Miocene has been exceptionally well preserved throughout a number of time periods. These has been classified by four "faunal zones", and may be summarised as,

 Faunal Zone A (FZA): late Oligocene, a period 23.03–28.4 million years before present
 Faunal Zone B (FZB): early Miocene, 15.97-23.03 myr
 Faunal Zone C (FZC): middle Miocene, 11.608-15.97 myr
 Faunal Zone D (FZD): late Miocene, 5.332-11.608 myr

More recent fossil specimens has also been coded to the period of deposition,
 Pliocene (PLIO), a period 2.588-5.332 myr
 Pleistocene (PLEIS), 0.0117-2.588 myr
 Holocene, noted as (HOLO) to indicate the period dated as following the Pleistocene, from the present day to 11,700 years ago.

Faunal lists 
The following are incomplete lists of mammals, birds, fish, and invertebrate species and genera included in the Riversleigh fauna, according to the compilation of taxa by researchers at the University of New South Wales and Queensland (wakaleo.net). A survey of species-level taxa described in the Riversleigh Fauna in the decades of research preceding 2006, resulted in a total greater than 290 species.

The fauna of Riversleigh includes placental mammals, especially bats, and the various families of marsupials. Due to the novelty of some taxa discovered in the area, some species have been placed in tentative arrangements or unknown lineages placed as sometimes undescribed higher taxa.

The Mammalia discovered at the site includes the Yingabalanaridae (weirdodonta) family, whose classification within the order is currently uncertain.

Bats 
 Brevipalatus mcculloughi Hand 2005, a hipposiderid bat, resembling the modern orange leaf-nosed Rhinonicteris aurantia
 Macroderma gigas a carnivorous bat, still living and known as the ghost bat
 Macroderma malugara a relation of the ghost bat, that existed in the middle Miocene
Rhinonicteris tedfordi, a microbat.

Marsupials and Monotremes
Badjcinus, a precursor of the thylacine
Balbaroo, an ancient kangaroo
Barinya, a carnivorous dasyuromorphian
Bettongia, a rat-kangaroo
Bulungamaya, an ancient kangaroo
Bulungu, a mouse-sized insectivorous bandicoot
Burramys, the mountain pygmy possum
Cercartetus, an ancient possum
Chunia, an ancient possum
Crash, a bandicoot
Djaludjangi, an ancient gliding possum
Djilgaringa, an ancient possum
Durudawiri, an ancient possum
Ekaltadeta, a carnivorous rat-kangaroo
Ektopodon, an ancient possum
Galadi, a carnivorous bandicoot
Galanarla, an ancient kangaroo
Ganawamaya, an ancient kangaroo
Ganbulanyi, a carnivorous dasyuromorphian
Ganguroo, an ancient kangaroo
Gawinga, an ancient ringtail possum
Gumardee, a rat-kangaroo
Hypsiprymnodon, a frugivorous rat-kangaroo
Joculusium muizoni, a carnivorous dasyuromorphian
Kuterintja, an extinct marsupial of the family Ilariidae
Lekaneleo, a marsupial lion
Litokoala, an ancient koala
Malleodectes, a marsupial with snail eating dentition
Marada (mammal), a sheep-like browser
Marlu, an ancient ringtail possum
Maximucinus, a precursor of the thylacine
Mayigriphus, a carnivorous dasyuromorphian
Muribacinus, a precursor of the thylacine
Mutpuracinus, a precursor of the thylacine
Nambaroo, an ancient kangaroo
Namilamadeta, an extinct marsupial of the family Wynyardiidae
Naraboryctes, a marsupial mole
Neohelos, a sheep-like browser
Ngamalacinus, a precursor of the thylacine
Ngapakaldia, a marsupial tapir
Nimbacinus, a precursor of the thylacine
Nimbadon, a sheep-like browser
Nimiokoala, an ancient koala
Obdurodon, a giant platypus
Onirocuscus, an ancient brushtail possum
Paljara, an ancient ringtail possum
Palorchestes, a marsupial tapir
Phascolarctos, an ancient koala
Pildra, an ancient ringtail possum
Priscakoala, an ancient koala
Priscileo, a marsupial lion
Propalorchestes, a marsupial tapir
Rhizophascolonus, an ancient wombat
Rhizosthenurus, an ancient kangaroo
Silvabestius, a sheep-like browser
Thylacinus, a precursor of the thylacine
Trichosurus, an ancient brushtail possum
Wabulacinus, a precursor of the thylacine
Wabularoo, an ancient kangaroo
Wakaleo, a marsupial lion
Wakiewakie, a rat-kangaroo
Wanburoo, an ancient kangaroo
Warendja, an ancient wombat
Wururoo, an ancient kangaroo
Wyulda, an ancient brushtail possum
Yalkaparidon, a bizarre marsupial
Yarala, a tube-nosed bandicoot
Yingabalanara richardsoni  (FZB) a mysterious mammal

Birds
Australlus, a flightless rail
Barawertornis, a mihirung
Cacatua, a cockatoo
Ciconia, a stork
Collocalia, a swiftlet
Corvitalusoides, an ancient passerine
Dromornis, a mihirung
Emuarius, an emuwary
Eoanseranas, a magpie-goose
Kurrartapu, a cracticid
Longmornis, an Old World oriole
Melopsittacus, a budgerigar
Menura, a lyrebird
Orthonyx, a logrunner
Pengana, a flexible-footed bird of prey
Pinpanetta, a stiff-tailed duck
Primophaps, a bronzewing pigeon

Reptiles
Baru, the cleaver-headed crocodile
Egernia, a skink
Elseya, a side neck turtle
Emydura, a side neck turtle
Incongruelaps, a venomous snake
Mekosuchus, a crocodile
Meiolania, a horned turtle
Morelia, a python
Nanowana, extinct snakes (Madtsoiidae)
Physignathus, a dragon lizard
Pseudemydura, a side neck turtle
Pygopus, a legless lizard
Quinkana, a crocodile
Ramphotyphlops, a blind snake
Sulcatidens, a dragon lizard
Tiliqua, a skink
Trilophosuchus, a tree-dwelling crocodile
Varanus, a monitor lizard
Warkalania, a horned turtle
Wonambi, extinct snakes (Madtsoiidae)

Amphibians
Crinia, a frog
Kyarranus, a frog
Lechriodus, a frog
Limnodynastes, a frog
Litoria, a tree-dwelling frog

Fishes
Mioceratodus, a lungfish
Neoceratodus, a lungfish

References 

 
Fauna of Queensland